Helen Elizabeth Sobel Smith (née Martin; May 22, 1909 – September 11, 1969) was an American bridge player. She is said to have been the "greatest woman bridge player of all time" and "may well have been the most brilliant card player of all time." She won 35 North American Bridge Championships, and was the first woman to play in the Bermuda Bowl. She was a long-time partner of Charles Goren.

Biography

Sobel Smith was born Helen Martin in Philadelphia, Pennsylvania to Cornelius and Ethel Martin (née Murphy). Her father, whose own father had emigrated from England, was working as a machinist when Helen was born in 1909, joining a 5-year-old sister, Dorothy.

Helen was a chorus girl in her youth. At age 16, she was already performing with the Marx Brothers in shows including The Cocoanuts and Animal Crackers. She only knew only how to play pinochle and Casino until another chorus girl taught her bridge: she took to the game like a duck to water. From that moment on, there was no doubt about her future.

She started earning a reputation in the mid-1930s, winning her first national championship in 1934. After a brief marriage to a Jack White that ended in 1930, she married bridge player Alexander M. Sobel (1901–1972), a former vaudeville performer who found better work in the Depression as a tournament director. Though she and Sobel eventually divorced in 1945, she achieved most of her success under the name Helen Sobel.

Sobel and Sally Young won the annual North American women  championship (now Whitehead Women's Pairs) in 1938 and again in 1939. That year Young became the first woman to achieve the rank of ACBL Life Master; Sobel became the second in 1941. (They were 17th and 25th overall, of whom the first twelve preceded ACBL.)

From 1943 to 1946, Sobel teamed with Young, Emily Folline, and Margaret Wagar to win the women teams four years in a row (Sternberg Women's Board-a-Match Teams, now a knockout format named for Wagar). 

She married Stanley Smith in 1966, and retired for two years. She died in a Detroit hospital at the age of 60 after a long battle with cancer. The monthly ACBL Bulletin remembered her as a player "without a peer among women and very few peers among men. Helen played like a man, it was true. But she also played like a lady."

Sobel Smith was inducted into the ACBL Hall of Fame in 1995, when the League established that honor by adding eight names to a list of nine whom The Bridge World had recognized in the 1960s. She was then the only woman among the 17. Her Hall of Fame citation paraphrases and quotes The Bridge World editor and publisher Edgar Kaplan:
"Helen's style was frisky and aggressive – so aggressive that 'some of her male partners were intimidated. These guys felt they were playing in the Mixed Pairs and they were the girl."

"In my lifetime", the citation also quotes Kaplan, "she is the only woman bridge player who was considered the best player in the world. She knows how to play a hand."

Anecdote

Bridge accomplishments

Honors
 ACBL Hall of Fame, 1995

Awards
 McKenney Trophy 1941, 1942, 1944
 Fishbein Trophy 1958

Wins
 North American Bridge Championships (35)
 Vanderbilt (2) 1944, 1945
 Spingold (5) 1944, 1947, 1951, 1956, 1960
 Chicago (now Reisinger) (4) 1941, 1943, 1950, 1957
 Master Mixed Teams (6) 1941, 1943, 1944, 1948, 1954, 1968
 Women's Board-a-Match Teams (7) 1935, 1936, 1939, 1943, 1944, 1945, 1946
 Life Master Pairs (2) 1942, 1958
 Fall National Open Pairs (3) 1940, 1947, 1948
 Rockwell Mixed Pairs (2) 1955, 1956
 Hilliard Mixed Pairs (1) 1944
 Women's Pairs (3) 1934, 1938, 1939

Runners-up
 IBL World Championship (1) 1937
 Bermuda Bowl (1) 1957
 North American Bridge Championships (31)
 Vanderbilt (7) 1942, 1949, 1950, 1953, 1955, 1959, 1962
 Spingold (2) 1943, 1950
 Chicago (now Reisinger) (2) 1944, 1951
 Master Mixed Teams (4) 1946, 1949, 1950, 1951
 Women's Board-a-Match Teams (10) 1937, 1941, 1942, 1950, 1952, 1954, 1955, 1956, 1957, 1958
 Life Master Pairs (1) 1953
 Fall National Open Pairs (1) 1938
 Hilliard Mixed Pairs (2) 1933, 1940
 Women's Pairs (2) 1947, 1965

Publications

 All the Tricks New York: Greenberg, 1949, 245 pp. – "With post-mortems by Charles H. Goren and Howard Dietz." 
 British edition, Winning Bridge (London: P. Davies, 1950), All the Tricks 
 Revised edition, All the Tricks (New York: Cornerstone Library, 1961), 186 pp. – " 'I find I had to do very little changing or revising or updating.'—Foreword."

References

External links
 
 
 
 
 Helen Sobel Smith at Bridgebum.com
 

1909 births
1969 deaths
Writers from Philadelphia
American contract bridge players
Bermuda Bowl players
Contract bridge writers
American female dancers
Dancers from Pennsylvania
Vaudeville performers
20th-century American dancers
20th-century American women